Anthony Higgins may refer to:

 Anthony Higgins (politician) (1840–1912), American lawyer and politician
 Anthony Higgins (actor) (born 1947), English actor